This list of tallest buildings in Tehran ranks High-rise buildings in Tehran by height. Tehran has the most high-rise buildings in Iran and its population density is the highest in the country. Note that the Milad Tower (at  the 6th tallest concrete tower in the world) is not listed here because it is an observation/telecommunications tower.

Tallest buildings
This includes spires and architectural details but does not include antenna masts.

Other Completed Towers 
Negar Tower, 27 floors.
Shahin Dezh I, 26 floors. 
Shahin Dezh II, 26 floors. 
Shahin Dezh III, 26 floors. 
Shahin Dezh IV, 26 floors. 
Kohe Nore Tower, 25 floors. 
Apadana Tower II, 26 floors. 
Apadana Tower III, 26 floors. 
Parsian Azadi Hotel (Azadi Grand Hotel), 26 floors. 
Bonyad-e-Tarikh Administrative Tower, 24 floors. 
Seda-va-sima Tower, 24 floors. 
Iran Zamin Towers, 23 floors. 
Apadana Tower I, 22 floors. 
Foreign Trade Bank of Iran, 20 floors. 
Central Bank of Iran,  (estimated), 20 floors. 
Pejman Tower, 20 floors.
Bucharest Tower, 16 floors. 
Bank Of Keshavarzi, 15 floors. 
Melli Complex, 17 floors. 
Esteghlal Grand Hotel, 16 floors. 
Homa Hotel Tehran, 16 floors. 
Milad Hospital, 15 floors. 
Qolhak Commercial Tower, 14 floors.
Laleh International Hotel, 13 floors. 
Pavyard Apartment Complex, 13 floors.

Under construction

Fereshteh Pasargad Hotel, 46 floors
Saman Faraz Tower 1, 50 floors
Sama Faraz Tower 2, 50 floors
Nadaja Marjan Tower 1, 42 floors. On hold
Nadaja Marjan Tower 2, 42 floors, On hold
Telecommunications Twin Towers 1, 30 floors. On hold
Telecommunications Twin Towers 2, 30 floors
AtiCenter Administrative Tower, 40 floors. On hold
Tehran International Financial Center, 28 floors
Espinas Palace Hotel, 34 floors
Tehran Third millennium Tower, 34 floors, 
Didar Complex, 26 floors
Alborz Tower, 26 floors
Narges Hotel, 38 floors.
Third Millennium Tower, 36 floors. On hold
Jam Tower, 33 floors.
AtiCenter Residential Tower 2, 30 floors. On hold
AtiCenter Residential Tower 1, 30 floors. On hold
Baran, 23 floors.

Timeline of tallest buildings
This is a list of buildings that in the past held the title of tallest building in Tehran. This list includes only residential, office and commercial buildings. Therefore, since the Milad Tower (at 435 m (1,427 ft) is an observation and telecommunications tower, it is not listed here

See also
 List of tallest buildings in Iran
 List of tallest structures in Iran

References

Tehran

Tallest
Tallest